Josef Presser (1907-1967) was an American artist.

Biography
Presser was born in 1907 in Lublin, Poland. He emigrated to the United States at the age of twelve and studied at the School of the Museum of Fine Arts, Boston. During the 1930s Presser  painted murals as part of the Works Progress Administration program. He settled in New York City where he worked as a painter and teacher. He  married fellow artist Agnes Hart (1912-1979) in 1941. The couple had studio space in Woodstock, New York. He was associated with the New York print studio Atelier 17. Presser died in Paris in 1967. 

Presser's work is included in the collections of the Metropolitan Museum of Art, the National Gallery of Art, the Smithsonian American Art Museum, and the Whitney Museum of American Art, His papers are in the Smithsonian Archives of American Art.

References

Further reading
Josef Presser 1909-1967, Raymond E. Tubbs, Frank Balters, Verlag Inter Art Gallerie Reich, Cologne, 1996

External links
images of Presser's work on ArtNet

1907 births
1967 deaths 
20th-century American artists
Atelier 17 alumni